Chua Lam (also known as Mandarin: Tsai Lan, Cantonese: Choi Lan, Teochew: Chùa Lāng) (simplified Chinese: , traditional Chinese: ,  born 1941 in Singapore) is a Singaporean columnist, food critic, and occasional television host based in Hong Kong. He was also a movie producer for the Hong Kong movie studio Golden Harvest.

Career

Media career 
Chua was a producer of several movies for Golden Harvest, including several films for Jackie Chan. Notable films include Mr. Nice Guy (credited as executive producer), Thunderbolt (credited as producer), Sex and Zen and City Hunter (credited as producer).

Chua is primarily known in Japan as a judge on the Fuji TV series Iron Chef.

Writing career 
Chua was a columnist on Oriental Daily in Hong Kong. Chua later switched to writing columns for the Next Media's publications, namely Next Magazine (on movies and a restaurant guide), Apple Daily and Eat and Travel Weekly. All columns have continued as of 2007.

Chua has written a number of books and restaurant guides on Hong Kong in Japanese. 

In recent years (2005 - current), Chua has organized special tours in Asia and around the world to sample the best local speciality food. Chua often writes, in his newspaper columns, about the tours' organizing trips where he and others sample food from four or five restaurants per day in order to select the best restaurants.

Filmography

Films

Television 
 2007: Market Trotter (蔡瀾逛菜欄)
 2007: Ten Years After (拾年)
 2008: Chu As Choice (蔡瀾歎名菜)
 2009: Be My Guest (志雲飯局)

Gastronomic philosophy 

One of Chua's most beloved dishes is stir-fried bean sprout with fried tofu and fish sauce.

Chua is famous for advocating the use of pork drippings in food preparation and as a condiment. He has cited and promoted the usage of pork fat in most of his TV shows.

Personal life
Chua's father, Chua Boon Hean (蔡文玄), was a native of the Jio Mung Chua (蔡門石) village in Chaozhou who immigrated to Singapore. His father worked in a high-ranking post at the Shaw Brothers Studio and died in 1997.

Chua was a student in Japan and lived there for several years.

Chua holds Singaporean citizenship, although he has been based in Hong Kong since 1963.

References

External links 
 
 
 Goo Movies (Japan)
 Cinemasie
 The New York Times entry
 Chua Lam's ebook website
 Food Critic Chua Lam Slammed Over Hotpot Critic 

1941 births
Living people
Hong Kong columnists
Hong Kong film producers
Hong Kong food writers
Hong Kong television presenters
Nihon University alumni
Singaporean emigrants to Hong Kong
Singaporean people of Teochew descent
Singaporean born Hong Kong artists